BMAG may refer to:
British Mensa Annual Gathering
Birmingham Museum & Art Gallery
Berliner Maschinenbau AG - German manufacturer of locomotives